Reagan Amyre Gomez-Preston (born April 24, 1980) is an American television, film and voice actress. She is known for her roles as Zaria Peterson on The WB sitcom The Parent 'Hood (1995–1999) and Roberta Tubbs on the FOX animated comedy The Cleveland Show (2009–2013). She has also reprised the role of Roberta Tubbs in occasional Family Guy appearances. Gomez-Preston also starred in the short-lived UPN sitcom Love, Inc. in the 2005–2006 season as Francine.

Early life
Gomez-Preston was born in Detroit, Michigan to a Puerto Rican mother, Cheryl Gomez and an African American father, Dr. Bennett Preston. She has a younger brother named Kyle. She is mixed-race.

Gomez-Preston's father, Bennett Preston, is a medical examiner/pathologist in Philadelphia. When Gomez-Preston was young, her mother worked for the Detroit Police Department. Cheryl Gomez was one of the first women assigned to street patrol. Due to verbal abuse, written racist epithets, death threats, and a commanding officer expressing interest in a relationship with her, she filed a sexual harassment suit against the Detroit Police Department, which she won, receiving an award somewhere between $800,000 and $1.2 million. After this Cheryl Gomez moved the family to Little Rock, Arkansas, then to Philadelphia. In Philadelphia, Gomez-Preston was enrolled in acting, dancing, and singing lessons at Philadelphia's Freedom Theatre. Her parents eventually divorced. In 1994, she moved from Philadelphia to Los Angeles with her mother and brother Kyle, so she could pursue an acting career.

Career
At 14 years old, Gomez-Preston began her acting career in The WB sitcom The Parent 'Hood, as Zaria Peterson. She guest starred on UPN's One on One as Flex's younger sister/Breanna's aunt, Bernadette. Also, she was a guest host of the weekly music series Soul Train, aired in December 1995. She also played Francine opposite Holly Robinson Peete in the short-lived UPN sitcom, Love Inc. She is also a former cast member of Nickelodeon's The Amanda Show. She has been featured in King magazine twice, first in the September/October 2003 issue, and again in the December 2006/January 2007 issue. She was one out of five cover girls in her second appearance. She also appeared in music videos such as "Sorry 2004" by Ruben Studdard, "No Better Love" by Young Gunz, and "Whatever You Like" by T.I.

Gomez-Preston is a writer of feature films, with her own business and production company. She voiced Roberta Tubbs, Cleveland Brown's stepdaughter on the FOX animated comedy The Cleveland Show from 2009 until the show's cancellation in 2013. Gomez-Preston replaced actress Nia Long.
Since 2014, she has had a recurring voice-over role as the twin sisters Jenny and Kiki Pizza on the animated Cartoon Network television series Steven Universe and in 2016, she began a recurring role on the OWN television drama Queen Sugar as Chantal Williams.

Personal life
Gomez-Preston began dating model DeWayne Turrentine in 1995. Turrentine was a member of the hip hop duo Quo. The couple married on November 10, 1999. They have two children, a daughter named Scarlett Annette Turrentine (born May 13, 2007) and a son named Tyger Attila Turrentine (born April 2, 2011).

Filmography

Film

Television

References

External links
 

1980 births
Living people
Actresses from Detroit
Actresses from Philadelphia
African-American actresses
American actresses of Puerto Rican descent
American child actresses
American film actresses
American television actresses
American voice actresses
Hispanic and Latino American actresses
21st-century African-American people
21st-century African-American women
20th-century African-American people
20th-century African-American women